Edom is the name given to Esau and the nation descending from him in the Hebrew Bible.

Edom may also refer to:
 Edom, Texas, a city in northeast Texas
 Edom Hill, a peak in the Indio Hills in Riverside County, California
 Thousand Palms, California, which was once called Edom

People with the surname
 Clifton C. Edom, American photojournalism educator